The women's 10 metre platform, also reported as 10-metre high diving, was one of four diving events on the Diving at the 1960 Summer Olympics programme.

The competition was split into two phases:

Preliminary round (29 August)
Divers performed four voluntary dives without limit of degrees of difficulty. The twelve divers with the highest scores advanced to the final.
Final (30 August)
Divers performed two voluntary dives without limit of degrees of difficulty. The final ranking was determined by the combined score from the preliminary and final rounds.

Results

References

Sources
  
 

Women
1960
1960 in women's diving
Div